The North Fork Big Thompson River is a  tributary of the Big Thompson River in Larimer County, Colorado.  The river's source is Rowe Glacier on the north slope of Hagues Peak, in the Mummy Range of Rocky Mountain National Park. It flows through Lake Dunraven, over Lost Falls and through Glen Haven before a confluence with the Big Thompson in Drake.

See also
 List of rivers of Colorado

References

Rivers of Rocky Mountain National Park
Rivers of Larimer County, Colorado
Tributaries of the Platte River